Elections to the Liverpool School Board were held on Friday 17 November 1882. 

There were twenty-two candidates for the fifteen places on the school board.

Each voter had fifteen votes to cast.

After the election, the composition of the school board was:

* - Retiring board member seeking re-election

Elected

Not Elected

References

1882
1882 English local elections
1880s in Liverpool
November 1882 events